The Garthwaite Baronetcy, of Durham, is a title in the Baronetage of the United Kingdom. It was created on 19 May 1919 for William Garthwaite. He was a shipowner and sugar planter and provided valuable service to the Admiralty during the First World War. As of 2010 the title is held by his grandson, the third Baronet, who succeeded his father in 1993. His daughter is the journalist Rosie Garthwaite.

Garthwaite baronets, of Durham (1919)
Sir William Garthwaite, 1st Baronet (1874–1956)
Sir William Garthwaite, 2nd Baronet (1906–1993)
Sir (William) Mark Charles Garthwaite, 3rd Baronet (born 1946)

Notes

References
Kidd, Charles, Williamson, David (editors). Debrett's Peerage and Baronetage (1990 edition). New York: St Martin's Press, 1990, 

Garthwaite